Thomas Matheson (1798 – 14 February 1873) was a British Whig politician. Son of Donald Matheson and brother of James Matheson (co-founder of Jardine Matheson & Co.), Matheson was born at Shinness, near Lairg, Sutherland, Scotland in 1798. In 1815 he joined the British Army as an Ensign. He became a lieutenant colonel in the 42nd Foot in 1843, when he retired on half-pay.

Matheson was elected unopposed as the Whig MP for Ashburton at the 1847 general election, taking up the seat previously held by his brother James Matheson. He stood down at the next election in 1852.

References

External links
 

UK MPs 1847–1852
Whig (British political party) MPs for English constituencies
Members of the Parliament of the United Kingdom for Ashburton
1798 births
1873 deaths